Argyropolis or Argyroupolis ("silver town") can refer to:
 Argyropolis (Thrace), a town of ancient Thrace, now in Turkey
 Gümüşhane in the Pontus (northeastern Turkey)
 Argyroupoli, a southern suburb of Athens, Greece, founded by refugees from Gümüşhane
 Argyroupoli, Rethymno, a village in the Rethymno regional unit, Crete
 Argirópolis, a city proposal by Argentinian statesman Domingo F. Sarmiento to be the capital of the Confederate States del Plata (Argentina, Paraguay and Uruguay)

References